Gro Marit Istad Kristiansen (born 9 February 1978) is a retired Norwegian biathlete from Voss. She has been on the Norwegian elite team since 1998. In 1998 she became junior world champion in the sprint event, and she won her first triumph as a senior at the 2005 World Championships where she won the 12.5 km mass start.

References

External links
 

1978 births
Norwegian female biathletes
Olympic biathletes of Norway
Biathletes at the 2002 Winter Olympics
Biathletes at the 2006 Winter Olympics
Biathletes at the 2010 Winter Olympics
Living people
Biathlon World Championships medalists
People from Voss
Sportspeople from Vestland
21st-century Norwegian women